The Grand Harbor Resort and Waterpark is a resort hotel and indoor waterpark located in Dubuque, Iowa.

Location and description 

The Grand Harbor is located on the banks of the Mississippi River, next to the Grand River Event Center.  The Grand Harbor is one of the newer hotels within the city. 

The resort features 193 rooms, 31 of which are suites.  All of the rooms have a small refrigerator, microwave, and a  television.  The entire hotel is equipped with high speed wireless internet.  Due to its location near the river, the rooms have a view of either the Mississippi River or the City of Dubuque's downtown area.  The hotel features meeting spaces, the two Platinum rooms on the second floor as well as a boardroom. In addition, the Grand Harbor is attached to the Grand River Center, a large event center located on the Mississippi.

The adjoining water park is the first indoor waterpark within the state of Iowa.  The waterpark has , with a tube waterslide, a regular pool, basketball pool, a lazy river, kiddie pool, hot tub, and a multi-story tree house complete with smaller slides, water guns, and an 850-gallon bucket that dumps water every 8 minutes.

The Mississippi Riverwalk adjoins the hotel.  Near the hotel is the Shot Tower, the National Mississippi River Museum and Aquarium, Diamond Jo Casino, and the Dubuque Star Brewery.  The Alliant Energy Amphitheater is located next to the brewery, and is the site of concerts and other events.

Impact

With the addition of the Grand Harbor, and with construction proceeding on a new Hilton hotel, many in the hotel industry have come to feel that the hotel market in Dubuque was becoming saturated.  Because of this, the Dubuque Inn - which had been open since 1971 - was sold and then closed.  The family that had owned the Dubuque Inn also put their other property - the Days Inn - up for sale as well.  Despite this, a number of hotel chains were still interested in establishing properties in Dubuque, and the Dubuque Inn has since been gutted and a portion of the original hotel building is being rebuilt as a Hampton Inn.

External links
 Grand Harbor Resort & Waterpark Website

Hotels in Iowa
Water parks in Iowa
Buildings and structures in Dubuque, Iowa
Economy of Dubuque, Iowa
Tourist attractions in Dubuque, Iowa